The Tanzanian shrew (Crocidura tansaniana) is a species of mammal in the family Soricidae. It is endemic to Tanzania.  Its natural habitat is subtropical or tropical moist montane forests.

References

Mammals of Tanzania
Endemic fauna of Tanzania
Crocidura
Mammals described in 1986
Taxonomy articles created by Polbot